Maksim Ščur (born 5 December 1977 in Brest, Belarus) is a Belarusian translator, writer and poet.

From 1994 until 1998, he was a student at the Minsk State Linguistic University. He has been living in Prague, Czech Republic since 1998. His notable novels are written in Czech, Swedish and Polish language including Śmierć tyrana (Сьмерць тырана, 1997),  "Amfiteatar" (Амфітэатар, Prague-Gdansk, 1999), "Rańni zbor" (Раньні збор, Stockholm 2006), "Amalhama" (Амальгама, Mińsk 2010). In 2004, he was awarded for Janki Juchnauca for his novel Tam dzie nas niama" (Там дзе нас няма).

References 

1977 births
Living people
20th-century Belarusian writers
21st-century Belarusian writers
Belarusian translators
Belarusian male poets
Belarusian male writers
Belarusian-language writers
Czech male poets
Czech-language writers
Czech people of Belarusian descent
Belarusian writers in Polish
Translators to Swedish
Translators to Czech
Translators to Polish
Writers from Brest, Belarus
Writers from Prague
20th-century male writers